Massachusetts House of Representatives' 7th Bristol district in the United States is one of 160 legislative districts included in the lower house of the Massachusetts General Court. It covers part of the city of Fall River in Bristol County. Democrat Alan Silvia of Fall River has represented the district since 2013.

The current district geographic boundary overlaps with that of the Massachusetts Senate's 1st Bristol and Plymouth district.

Representatives
 Josiah C. Blaisdell, circa 1858 
 Jona. E. Morrill, circa 1858 
 Thomas T. Potter, circa 1859 
 Stephen C. Wrightington, circa 1859 
 George W. Slocum, circa 1888 
 Alfred M. Bessette, circa 1920 
 D. Herbert Cook, circa 1920 
 Allison Rice Dorman, circa 1951 
 Joseph A. Sylvia, Jr., circa 1951 
 James Anthony O'Brien, Jr., circa 1975 
 Robert Correia
 Kevin Aguiar
 Alan Silvia, 2013-current

Former locales
The district previously covered:
 Fairhaven, circa 1927 
 part of New Bedford, circa 1927

See also
 List of Massachusetts House of Representatives elections
 Other Bristol County districts of the Massachusetts House of Representatives: 1st, 2nd, 3rd, 4th, 5th, 6th, 8th, 9th, 10th, 11th, 12th, 13th, 14th
 List of Massachusetts General Courts
 List of former districts of the Massachusetts House of Representatives

Images

References

External links
 Ballotpedia
  (State House district information based on U.S. Census Bureau's American Community Survey).

House
Government of Bristol County, Massachusetts